Sollentuna is one of the five stations of the Stockholm commuter rail in Sollentuna Municipality. It is situated in the neighbourhood of Tureberg 13.3 km north of Stockholm Central Station. The station was originally called Tureberg and was opened in 1866 in a rural setting along the railway Stockholm–Uppsala. The name was changed to Sollentuna in 1968 at the request of the municipality, since Tureberg is the de facto centre of the municipality. The area around the station has developed into a suburban centre with high rise buildings, a bus terminal and a large shopping mall.

References

Railway stations in Stockholm County
Railway stations opened in 1866
1866 establishments in Sweden